Erik Axel Rickard Elveljung (born Erik Axel Rickard Johansson; 6 March 1989) is a Swedish footballer who plays as a striker for Rasbo IK. He has previously played for IF Brommapojkarna and Östers IF, as well as represented the Sweden U17 and U19 teams.

References

1989 births
Living people
Östers IF players
IF Brommapojkarna players
Swedish footballers
Association football forwards